University of Calabar Teaching Hospital (UCTH), was established in 1979 to provide tertiary health care through training of undergraduate medical students at the University of Calabar, Calabar. The facility is located at Calabar in Calabar Municipality Local Government Area of Cross River State, South South, Nigeria. UCTH is affiliated with University of Calabar, Calabar.

Leadership 
UCTH is headed by a Chief Medical Director who is responsible to the Minister of Health. In 2019, the Federal Government appointed Prof. Ikpeme A. Ikpeme as the new Chief Medical Director.

Location 
The locations of UCTH are as follows:  

UCTH  main Campus, Airport Road, Calabar
UCTH Federal Secretariat Clinic, MM Highway, Calabar
Comprehensive Health Centre, Odukpani Local Government Area

References

External links
 

Teaching hospitals in Nigeria 
Medical research institutes in Nigeria